José João da Conceição Gonçalves Mattoso (born at Leiria, January 23, 1933) is a Portuguese medievalist and university professor.

Mattoso earned his doctoral degree in medieval history from the Catholic University of Leuven, in Belgium, in 1966 (with a thesis on the abbey of Pendorada - "L'Abbaye de Pendorada  : des Origines à 1160"), while he was Benedictine monk at the Abbey of Singeverga. He returned to  secular life in 1970, and taught at the University of Lisbon and at the New University of Lisbon. He was also a director of National Archives / Torre do Tombo.

He is recognized in Portugal and internationally as one of the most distinguished scholars of the history of medieval Portugal, and  much of his scholarly work is largely devoted to that period. His works include, among others, "Ricos homens, Infanções e Cavaleiros" (on the medieval society), "Fragments of a Medieval Composition" (in response to the arguments of Antonio Borges Coelho), and "Identification of A country Essay on the Origins of Portugal (1096–1325)" (Vol. I - 'Opposition' vol. II - 'Composition'), with five editions constantly revised and updated between 1985 and 1995. Mattoso was awarded the Alfredo Pimenta prize of Medieval History, and the non-fiction Prize of Pen club for this work. He was also awarded the Fernando Pessoa Prize in 1987, among other important distinctions.

He acted as the scientific editor of a History of Portugal (1993–1995) in eight volumes.

Bibliography 
Le monarchisme ibérique et Cluny. Les monastères du diocése de Porto de l'an mille à 1200, 1968
As famílias condais portucalenses dos séculos X e XI, 1970
Beneditina Lusitana, 1974
Livro de linhagens do Conde D. Pedro, ed. crítica, 1980
Livros velhos de linhagens, ed. crítica por Joseph Piel e José Mattoso, 1980
A nobreza medieval portuguesa. A família e o poder, 1981 ; 1994
Ricos-Homens, infanções e cavaleiros. A nobreza medieval portuguesa nos sécs. XI e XII, 1982 ; 1998
Religião e cultura na Idade Média portuguesa, 1982 ; 1997
Narrativas dos Livros de Linhagens, selecção, introdução e comentários, 1983
Portugal medieval. Novas interpretações, 1985 ; 1992
O essencial sobre a formação da nacionalidade, 1985 ; 1986
Identificação de um país. Ensaio sobre as origens de Portugal, 1096–1325, 1985 ; 1995
O essencial sobre a cultura medieval portuguesa, 1985 ; 1993
A escrita da história, 1986
Fragmentos de uma composição medieval, 1987 ; 1990
O essencial sobre os provérbios medievais portugueses, 1987
A escrita da História. Teoria e métodos, 1988 ; 1997
O castelo e a feira. A Terra de Santa Maria nos séculos XI a XIII, em colab. com Amélia Andrade, Luís Krus, 1989
Almada no tempo de D. Sancho I (Comunicação), 1991
Os primeiros reis (História de Portugal - Vol. I) (Infanto-juvenil), com Ana Maria Magalhães, Isabel Alçada, 1993 ; 2001
A Terra de Santa Maria no século XIII. Problemas e documentos, em colab. com Amélia Andrade, Luís Krus, 1993
No Reino de Portugal (História de Portugal - Vol. II) (Infanto-juvenil), com Ana Maria Magalhães, Isabel Alçada, 1994 ; 2003 Coja, 1995
Tempos de revolução (História de Portugal - Vol. III) (Infanto-juvenil), com Ana Maria Magalhães, Isabel Alçada, 1995
O reino dos mortos na Idade Média peninsular, ed. lit., 1996
A Identidade Nacional, 1998; 2003
A função social da História no mundo de hoje, 1999
A dignidade. Konis Santana e a resistência timorense, 2005
D. Afonso Henrique, 2007
Naquele Tempo. Ensaios de História Medieval; 2009;2014

External links
José Mattoso at IPLB (portuguese lang)

.

Portuguese Benedictines
1933 births
20th-century Portuguese historians
Living people
People from Leiria
Pessoa Prize winners
21st-century Portuguese historians